Black Level is a 2017 Ukrainian drama film directed by Valentyn Vasyanovych. It was selected as the Ukrainian entry for the Best Foreign Language Film at the 90th Academy Awards, but it was not nominated.

Plot
Kostya, a 50-year-old wedding photographer, experiences a midlife crisis after his father is paralyzed by a stroke and his girlfriend leaves him.

Cast
 Kostyantyn Mokhnach as Kostya
 Kateryna Molchanova as Katya

See also
 List of submissions to the 90th Academy Awards for Best Foreign Language Film
 List of Ukrainian submissions for the Academy Award for Best Foreign Language Film

References

External links
 

2017 films
2017 drama films
Ukrainian drama films
Ukrainian-language films
Films directed by Valentyn Vasyanovych